William Thomas Carroll (June 25, 1902 – October 25, 1992) was an American politician who was the 91st lieutenant governor of Connecticut from 1949 to 1951.

Early life
William T. Carroll was born in Torrington, Litchfield County, Connecticut, June 25, 1902 He graduated from Torrington High School and worked for the Brooks Bank and Trust Company in Torrington for 25 years.

Political career
Carroll was a Democrat. He was Connecticut State Treasurer from 1945, but was defeated for reelection in 1946, thus ending his term in early 1947. In 1948, he was running mate of gubernatorial candidate Chester Bowles and won, they entered service on January 5, 1949. They ran for reelection in November 1950, but lost and ended their service on January 3, 1951.

Carroll lost bids for the United States Senate in 1952 and the Governorship in 1954. He was the mayor of Torrington from 1953 to 1957. From 1962, he ran a real-estate office in Hartford.

He died on Sunday October 25, 1992, in Torrington, at the age of 90.

See also
List of governors of Connecticut

References

1902 births
1992 deaths
People from Torrington, Connecticut
Lieutenant Governors of Connecticut
Mayors of places in Connecticut
State treasurers of Connecticut
20th-century American politicians